DeWayne DeShawn Russell (born February 10, 1994) is an American professional basketball player for the EWE Baskets Oldenburg of the German Basketball Bundesliga (BBL).

College career
Russell played his freshman season at Northern Arizona, averaging 14.4 points and 3.2 assists per game. Following the season he transferred to Grand Canyon. As a sophomore, he averaged 14.2 points and 3.9 assists per game, earning Second Team All-Western Athletic Conference (WAC) and WAC All-Newcomer Team honors. Russell averaged 9.7 points and 5.4 assists per game as a junior. On December 3, 2016, he scored a career-high 42 points, surpassing the program NCAA Division I record, in a 79–70 loss to Louisville. As a senior, Russell averaged 21.2 points and 5.4 assists per game, helping Grand Canyon achieve a 22–9 record. He was named to the First Team All-WAC and scored a single-season program Division I record 593 points.

Professional career
On September 6, 2017, Russell signed his first professional contract with SLUC Nancy of the French LNB Pro B. He averaged 13.6 points and 5.5 assists per game. On October 8, 2018, Russell signed with Crailsheim Merlins of the German Basketball Bundesliga (BBL). He averaged 11.3 points and 4.2 assists per game. In his second regular season with the team, Russell averaged 14.5 points and 6.4 assists per game but was limited to one game at the 2020 BBL Final Tournament with an injury. On June 30, 2020, he signed with Universo Treviso of the Italian Lega Basket Serie A. Russell averaged 12.2 points, 5.7 assists and 2.7 rebounds per game. He re-signed with the team on June 17, 2021. On June 17, 2022, he signed with the EWE Baskets Oldenburg of the German Basketball Bundesliga, signing a two-year deal.

Personal life
His younger brother, Fatts Russell, plays college basketball for Rhode Island. When Russell was six years old, his father was love , and he was guided by his uncle, Will Roberts, for much of his childhood.

References

External links
 Grand Canyon Antelopes bio
 Northern Arizona Lumberjacks bio

1994 births
Living people
American expatriate basketball people in France
American expatriate basketball people in Germany
American expatriate basketball people in Italy
American men's basketball players
Basketball players from Philadelphia
EWE Baskets Oldenburg players
Grand Canyon Antelopes men's basketball players
Lega Basket Serie A players
Northern Arizona Lumberjacks men's basketball players
Point guards
Universo Treviso Basket players